Samatit is a village in the rural community of Mlomp, Loudia Ouoloff, Oussouye, Ziguinchor, Casamance.

Geography
The nearest towns are Carabane, Kagnout, Loudia Diola, Elinkine, Santhiaba Ouolof.

External links
 Maps, weather and airports for Samatit

Populated places in Ziguinchor Region